Yuan Wei-jen (born 24 June 1968) is a Taiwanese singer-songwriter and record producer. Yuan is best known for writing many hit songs for leading Mandopop artists like Na Ying, Faye Wong and S.H.E.

Discography
 With Mo Fan (莫凡), as a member of the pop duet Nobody (凡人)
Cuckoo's Dusk (杜鵑鳥的黃昏, 1991)
How Should I Keep You (我要用什麼樣的方式留你, 1992)
Let's Hear Me Sing a Song (大夥聽我唱支歌, 1993)
Willing (心甘情願, 1994)
Appeal (上訴, 1994)
Unlucky Duo (難兄難弟, 1995)

 As a solo artist
Yuan Wei Jen (2000)
You Don't Know Me (你不知道的我, 2005)
Acoustic Guitar (木吉他, 2014)

Songs written for other artists
For Faye Wong: "Zhimi Buhui" (執迷不悔, title track of No Regrets), "Guoyan Yunyan" (過眼雲煙, from Lovers & Strangers), "Xuanmu" (旋木, from To Love)
For Na Ying: "Zhengfu" (征服), "Meng Xing Le" (夢醒了), "Meng Yi Chang" (夢一場)
For Sammi Cheng: "Beipan" (背叛, from Worth It), "Quexi" (缺席)

He has also written songs for Wang Zheng, Alan Dawa Dolma, Chao Chuan, Chyi Chin, Eric Moo, Matilda Tao, Jacky Wu, Tanya Chua, Maggie Chiang, Dream Girls, Hebe Tien, Fish Leong, Rene Liu, Han Geng, A-Mei, and Jason Zhang.

Awards and nominations

References

1968 births
Living people
Taiwanese Mandopop singer-songwriters